Following is a list of senators of Puy-de-Dôme, people who have represented the department of Puy-de-Dôme in the Senate of France.

Third Republic

Senators for Puy-de-Dôme under the French Third Republic were:

Jacques Mège (1876–1878)
Prosper-Claude de Barante (1876–1882)
Mathieu Salneuve (1876–1889)
Jean-Baptiste Guyot-Lavaline (1879–1900)
Robert Goutay (1882–1889)
François Girot-Pouzol (1885–1891)
Gilbert Le Guay (1889–1891)
Gilbert Gaillard (1889–1898)
Charles Barrière (1891–1909)
Hippolyte Gomot (1891–1927)
Jean Chantagrel (1898–1907)
Victor Bataille (1900–1908)
Antoine Bony-Cisternes (1907–1927)
Léon Chambige (1909–1914)
Pierre-Jean Sabaterie (1909–1930)
Étienne Clémentel (1920–1936)
Louis Darteyre (1927–1932)
Baptiste Marrou (1927–1936)
Eugène Chassaing (1930–1940)
Paul Malsang (1933–1937)
Eugène Roy (1936–1938)
Pierre Laval (1936–1940)
François Albert-Buisson (1937–1940)
Jacques Bardoux (1938–1940)

Fourth Republic

Senators for Puy-de-Dôme under the French Fourth Republic were:

Fifth Republic 
Senators for Puy-de-Dôme under the French Fifth Republic were:

References

Sources

 
Lists of members of the Senate (France) by department